The 1995–96 season in Dutch football saw holders Ajax Amsterdam winning the title in the Eredivisie once again, while PSV Eindhoven won the Dutch National Cup. Starting from this season a victory yields three points instead of two.

Super Cup

Eredivisie

Champions League : Ajax Amsterdam
Cup Winners Cup: PSV Eindhoven
UEFA Cup: Feyenoord Rotterdam
UEFA Cup: Roda JC

Topscorers

Awards

Dutch Footballer of the Year
 1995 — Luc Nilis (PSV Eindhoven)
 1996 — Ronald de Boer (Ajax Amsterdam)

Dutch Golden Shoe Winner
 1995 — Danny Blind (Ajax Amsterdam)
 1996 — Danny Blind (Ajax Amsterdam)

Ajax Winning Squad 1995-'96

Goal
 Fred Grim
 Edwin van der Sar

Defence
 Danny Blind
 Frank de Boer
 Winston Bogarde
 Marcio Santos
 Michael Reiziger
 Sonny Silooy

Midfield
 Ronald de Boer
 Edgar Davids
 Denny Landzaat
 Jari Litmanen
 Kiki Musampa
 Martijn Reuser
 Arnold Scholten

Attack
 Dave van den Bergh
 Andrey Demchenko

 Finidi George
 Peter Hoekstra
 Nwankwo Kanu
 Patrick Kluivert
 Marc Overmars
 Dennis Schulp
 Ignacio Tuhuteru
 Nordin Wooter

Management
 Louis van Gaal (Coach)
 Gerard van der Lem (Assistant)
 Bobby Haarms (Assistant)

Eerste Divisie

Promotion and relegation

Group A

Group B

Stayed : NEC Nijmegen and FC Volendam

KNVB Cup

Final

Dutch national team

References
 RSSSF Archive

 
Seasons in Dutch football
Dutch Football, 1995-96 In
F
F